Eternal Atake is the second studio album by American rapper Lil Uzi Vert. It is their first project since their 2017 studio album Luv Is Rage 2. After being initially announced in 2018, the album was released on March 6, 2020, through Generation Now and Atlantic Records as a surprise release. The album was supported by the singles "Futsal Shuffle 2020" and "That Way", which later appeared as the album's bonus tracks. The album features a sole guest appearance from American singer Syd.

Eternal Atake received widespread acclaim and debuted atop the US Billboard 200, becoming Lil Uzi Vert's second US number-one album. The deluxe version of the album, titled Lil Uzi Vert vs. the World 2, was released a week later on March 13, featuring new guest appearances from Chief Keef, 21 Savage, Future, Young Thug, Gunna, Lil Durk, Young Nudy, and Nav.

Background
In July 2018, Lil Uzi Vert published two messages to Twitter, "Eternal Atake" and "Eternal means forever. Atake means 2 overtake", that were described as cryptic. On July 31, 2018, which was also Lil Uzi's 23rd birthday, they removed all posts from their Instagram profile except for two—a snippet of "New Patek" and the old cover art of Eternal Atake. On December 9, Lil Uzi confirmed that Eternal Atake had been finished and was set for release.

On January 11, 2019, Lil Uzi announced via Instagram that they had "deleted everything" and were "done with music", although many believed this could merely have been a publicity stunt and/or a promotional roll-out for the album. On March 3, 2020, Lil Uzi revealed a new album cover on Twitter, after allowing fans to vote on the new cover.

Theme
On March 7, 2020, a fan noticed on Twitter that the album was split into 3 parts which represent the different personas of Woods including: "Baby Pluto" (track 1–6), "Renji" (track 7–12) and "Lil Uzi Vert" (track 13–18); this was confirmed by Lil Uzi. They also confirmed that the first half of the album represent Uzi Vert taking off in a spaceship while the second half represents them journeying through space.

Artwork

On July 13, 2018, Lil Uzi shared the original cover art of Eternal Atake, which is a rework of Heaven's Gate's logo. The cover art consists of the words "Eternal Atake" written inside a keyhole. In response to the cover art, the two surviving members of the cult suggested that legal actions could be taken against Lil Uzi for using their logo. A representative of the group stated in an email that "[Uzi] is using and adapting our copyrights and trademarks without our permission and the infringement will be taken up with our attorneys. This is not fair use or parody, it is a direct and clear infringement".

On March 2 and 3, 2020, Lil Uzi previewed three cover arts via Twitter and asked their fans to pick the cover they preferred in a series of polls. The second cover won and became the album's official artwork, however; Lil Uzi confirmed that they would still use the third cover, but as the background for the tracklist, and as a back cover for physical copies.

Release and promotion
On November 30, Lil Uzi tweeted that the single they are "going with" from Eternal Atake would be a "dance record" titled "Futsal"; it was released on December 13, 2019, as "Futsal Shuffle 2020" and the album's first single. The album's second single "That Way", was spontaneously released on March 1, 2020. It interpolates the hook to Backstreet Boys' "I Want It That Way".

The album was originally set to be released on July 19, 2019, before this ultimately missed with Lil Uzi commenting on they simply don't know when the album would be releasing. Lil Uzi later returned on an Instagram Live on February 28, 2020, to announce that the album would be released within two weeks, potentially making the release date March 13, 2020. However, Lil Uzi unexpectedly released the album on March 6, 2020.

On March 7, Lil Uzi announced a deluxe edition on Twitter. Two of these tracks were confirmed the same day: "Bean (Kobe)" which features American rapper Chief Keef and "Myron", two tracks that have been previously previewed by Lil Uzi Vert on social media. They later teased that songs with Young Thug, Future, A Boogie wit da Hoodie and Lil Baby were complete. The second part of the album, entitled Lil Uzi Vert vs. the World 2, was released on March 13, 2020.

Promotional singles
On September 18, 2018, Lil Uzi released a promotional single called "New Patek". On April 9, 2019, two new promotional singles were released: "That's a Rack" and "Sanguine Paradise".

Short film
On March 3, 2020, Lil Uzi released a 2-minute long short film titled "Baby Pluto" teasing the album's release. It was directed by Gibson Hazard and Lil Uzi Vert respectively.

Critical reception

Eternal Atake was met with widespread critical acclaim. At Metacritic, which assigns a normalized rating out of 100 to reviews from professional publications, the album received an average score of 84, based on nine reviews.

Writing for Consequence, M. T. Richards gave the album a favorable review, stating that "Eternal Atake splits the difference between P-Funk and electro. In an ironic twist of fate, the year's most futuristic rap album comes courtesy of someone who'd been dismissed as a relic". Richards further praises Uzi Vert's performance, saying that they sound "alert, refreshed, and sometimes thrilled" on the album. In her review for NME, Kyann-Sian Williams praised the album, writing, "Again, [they have] made another record that will stay close to the hearts of a generation of rap fans. [They are] surely our generation's Lil Wayne". Writing for Exclaim!, Kyle Mullin stated positive opinions regarding the album, praising the production as well as the transitions between songs. Mullin mentions that "Uzi nimbly switches from relatedly lovelorn speak-singing on 'Bust Me' to rugged, speedy punch line powerhouse on the very next track, 'Prices'. That transition is merely one of the energetic and unpredictable performative tricks Uzi pulls off on this stadium sized LP". Scott Glaysher of HipHopDX said, "There is no denying Lil Uzi Vert's unconventional version of rap has been polarizing for the better part of the last five years yet Eternal Atake should be celebrated. [They maneuver] within the cockpit of [their] comfort zone, navigating a galaxy of different genres while keeping the essence of rap at the forefront". Alphonse Pierre of Pitchfork gave the album a positive review, saying that "The expectations were otherworldly. And somehow, Uzi met those expectations. Eternal Atake is Uzi's greatest album to date, a scope-defying hour-long epic that couldn't be made by anyone else".

Fred Thomas of AllMusic saying "Even though it's a lengthy journey and some of the songs start to feel similar, nothing here is filler". Danny Schwartz of Rolling Stone was also positive towards the album, stating that "It is difficult to remember a rap album released to such fervid expectations, let alone one that lived up to those expectations. Eternal Atake is Lil Uzi Vert's best album yet, with a cohesiveness, slick concept, and performance that justifies every ounce of hype". In a mixed review, RapReviews critic Steve "Flash" Juon wrote the following: "If you absolutely can not stand rappers who should be called singers then you need to take a hard pass on Vert, but if you occasionally (or more often than that) enjoy the crooning, Vert is at least someone who can put it together in a way that is surprisingly decent and occasionally quite good."

Rankings

Industry awards

Commercial performance
Eternal Atake debuted atop the US Billboard 200 dated March 21, 2020, with 288,000 album-equivalent units (including 9,000 pure album sales). The album earned 400 million US streams in its first week, which was the fourth-largest streaming debut at the time of its release. It is Lil Uzi Vert's second US number-one album. The album remained at number one on the Billboard 200 in its second week with 247,000 album-equivalent units. It was sustained in part due to a deluxe edition which was released the following week. Eternal Atake was the seventh best selling album of 2020 with 1.860 million album-equivalent units in the United States.

Following its first week of availability, three songs from the album debuted in the top ten of the US Billboard Hot 100, led by "Baby Pluto" at number six, "Lo Mein" at number eight and "Silly Watch" at number nine, making Lil Uzi Vert the fourth act to debut at least three songs in the Hot 100's top 10 simultaneously. The same week, they charted 20 total songs, including all 18 from Eternal Atake (16 of which debuted).

Following its first day of release, Eternal Atake occupied every position within the top 20 on Spotify's US Top 50 chart, except three positions. The track "Baby Pluto" also dethroned Roddy Ricch's "The Box" from the top spot on the chart with over 3.3 million US streams, marking the first time the song descended from number one since late December 2019.

Track listing

Notes
 "Pop" is stylized in all capital letters

Sample credits
 "You Better Move" contains elements of the video game Full Tilt! Pinball.
 "Celebration Station" contains a sample of "Raindrops (An Angel Cried)", as performed by Ariana Grande.
 "Prices" contains a sample of "Way Back", written by Jacques Webster, Rogét Chahayed, Scott Mescudi, Kasseem Dean, Magnus Høiberg, Chauncey Hollis, Jr., Brittany Hazzard, Carlton Mays, Jr., and Mike Dean, as performed by Travis Scott; and an interpolation of "Hickory Dickory Dock".
 "P2" contains a sample of "XO Tour Llif3", as performed by Lil Uzi Vert.
 "Futsal Shuffle 2020" contains audio samples from Nardwuar and a live rendition of "Boredom", as performed by Tyler, the Creator.
 "That Way" contains interpolations from "I Want It That Way", written by Andreas Carlsson and Max Martin, as performed by the Backstreet Boys.

Personnel
Credits adapted from Tidal and Billboard.

 Chris Athens – mastering
 Kesha "K. Lee" Lee – mixing, recording
 Brendan Morawski – mixing (1, 2, 7, 8, 10, 11, 13–16, 18)
 Gina Vosti – mix engineering (1), mix assistance (2), engineering assistance (3, 4)
 Nathan Feler – engineering assistance (1)
 Montez Roberts – engineering assistance (4), recording assistance (15)
 Rodolfo "Fofo" Cruz – engineering assistance (4)
 Popnick – additional sounds (5)
 Anthony "Kaotic" Martinez – engineering assistance (5)
 Kam Krieger – engineering assistance (6)
 Chris Ku – engineering assistance (7)
 Jordan Franzino – engineering assistance (7)
 Wanmor – additional vocals (8, 9, 12, 13)
 The Ensemble – background vocals (8–13)

Charts

Weekly charts

Year-end charts

Certifications

Notes

References

2020 albums
Albums produced by Don Cannon
Albums produced by TM88
Atlantic Records albums
Heaven's Gate (religious group)
Lil Uzi Vert albums
Albums produced by Chief Keef
Albums produced by Wheezy
Science fiction concept albums